The 1999 NCAA Division I Indoor Track and Field Championships were contested to determine the individual and team national champions of men's and women's NCAA collegiate indoor track and field events in the United States after the 1998–99 season, the 35th annual meet for men and 17th annual meet for women.

After serving as host for the previous ten years, the championships were held at the RCA Dome in Indianapolis, Indiana for the last time.

Two-time defending champions Arkansas again won the men's team title, the Razorbacks' fifteenth overall and fifteenth in sixteen years.

Defending champions Texas won the women's team title, the Longhorns' fifth overall and second consecutive.

Qualification
All teams and athletes from Division I indoor track and field programs were eligible to compete for this year's individual and team titles.

Team standings 
 Note: Top 10 only
 Scoring: 6 points for a 1st-place finish in an event, 4 points for 2nd, 3 points for 3rd, 2 points for 4th, and 1 point for 5th
 (DC) = Defending Champions

Men's title
 59 teams scored at least one point

Women's title
 60 teams scored at least one point

References

NCAA Indoor Track and Field Championships
Ncaa Indoor Track And Field Championships
Ncaa Indoor Track And Field Championships